Anrich Richter (born  in Kempton Park, South Africa) is a South African rugby union player for the  in the Currie Cup and the Rugby Challenge. His regular position is scrum-half, but he has occasionally played winger or centre.

Career

Youth

At high school level, Richter played for Hoërskool Birchleigh in the Falcons' regions schools league. In 2010, he was included in the  side that participated in the 2010 Under-19 Provincial Championship, scoring five tries and kicking five conversions in his eight appearances, which included an 18-point haul in their match against , scoring two tries and four conversions.

He made six starts for the  side in the 2011 Under-21 Provincial Championship, underlining his versatility as he was used in a variety of positions, starting three matches at right wing, two matches at scrum-half and one match at outside centre.

Falcons

Despite still being just 21, he firmly established himself as a first-team regular, starting seven of their fourteen matches during the 2012 Currie Cup First Division and playing off the bench on a further six occasions.

He was the undoubted first-choice scrum-half for the Falcons in 2013, starting sixteen of their 21 matches in the 2013 Vodacom Cup and 2013 Currie Cup First Division competitions, scoring six tries in the Currie Cup, the second-most by a Falcons player behind centre Willie Odendaal, but could not prevent the Falcons finishing bottom of the log.

He played six times during the 2014 Vodacom Cup and started all six matches during the 2014 Currie Cup qualification tournament, where the  finished second-last to remain in the 2014 Currie Cup First Division.

References

South African rugby union players
Living people
1991 births
People from Kempton Park, Gauteng
Rugby union scrum-halves
Falcons (rugby union) players
Rugby union players from Gauteng